This is a list of the most watched premieres on Nickelodeon. It includes movies, TV episodes, special events (i.e. the Nickelodeon Kids' Choice Awards) and crossover events with over 6 million viewers. Reruns are not included.

References

Nickelodeon
Nickelodeon Movies
Nickelodeon-related lists